Shrewsbury Abbey was a railway station in Shrewsbury, Shropshire, England part of the Shropshire and Montgomeryshire Railway. It was named after the nearby Shrewsbury Abbey. The station had an adjacent goods yard and wagon building works.

Shrewsbury Abbey was originally planned to be just one station on a railway from Llanymynech to Market Drayton but when financial problems halted the project, it became the permanent terminus. However it was never connected to Shrewsbury Station. All passenger services would have to change here. This was because access to the mainline station was rejected on financial grounds and the obstruction of Shrewsbury station's joint operators, the Great Western Railway (GWR) and the London and North Western Railway.

History

Shrewsbury Abbey station opened on 13 August 1866 as the temporary end of the Potteries, Shrewsbury and North Wales Railway (always known locally as 'The Potts'). It was built on part of a monastery that had been destroyed during the Reformation. In 1876 a railway carriage and wagon building works of the Midland Wagon Company operated next to the station. It closed in 1912.

When the station became the permanent terminus after financial difficulties caused the abandonment of the planned extension to Market Drayton, it struggled to make money.  On 22 June 1880 Shrewsbury Abbey closed for the first time when the railway could no longer continue services; a rare example of a railway closure in Britain in the 19th century.

Several attempts were made to reopen the railway and in the 1890–91 a start was made on remodelling the station before financial problems again caused work to cease. The station was finally reopened on 13 April 1911 with a rebuilt line now known as the Shropshire and Montgomeryshire Railway.  It finally closed to all passengers (except specials) on 6 November 1933.

Wartime role
At the outbreak of World War II, the Shropshire and Montgomeryshire Light Railway was taken over by the War Department. Shrewsbury Abbey station reopened for military personnel in 1941. The Royal Engineers reconstructed the railway and built a top secret storage explosives depot at Kinnerley. The site was not declassified until the 1950s. The entire railway was closed by the military in 1960. Official closure was on 29 February, connection to the system being maintained by a new link to the Severn Valley Railway.

Later use
After Shrewsbury Abbey station closed, the goods yard was occupied by an oil depot until its closure on 5 July 1988. The site is now occupied by a surface car park, and the original station building and platform built for the Shropshire and Montgomeryshire was restored in 2005–06.

See also
Abbey Foregate railway station - another station, not on Abbey Foregate itself

References

External links
 The station on navigable 1946 O. S. map

Disused railway stations in Shropshire
Buildings and structures in Shrewsbury
Railway stations in Great Britain opened in 1866
Railway stations in Great Britain closed in 1933
Railway stations in Great Britain closed in 1866
Railway stations in Great Britain opened in 1868
Railway stations in Great Britain closed in 1880
Railway stations in Great Britain opened in 1911